These are the singles that reached number one on the Top 100 Singles chart in 1993 as published by Cash Box magazine.

See also
1993 in music
List of Hot 100 number-one singles of 1993 (U.S.)

References

https://web.archive.org/web/20110818051728/http://cashboxmagazine.com/archives/90s_files/1993.html

1993
1993 record charts
1993 in American music